Colwich railway station is a disused railway station in Colwich, Staffordshire, England.

By 1847, the Trent Valley Railway company had been incorporated in the London and North Western Railway (LNWR) and the line was opened. A station opened at Colwich in September of that year and, like most of the stations on the Trent Valley Railway, it was designed by the architect John William Livock.

In 1849, the railway line between Stone and Colwich was opened by the North Staffordshire Railway (NSR). At Colwich, the LNWR and NSR agreed to own and operate the station jointly; a situation that remained until both railways became part of the London, Midland and Scottish Railway in 1923.

Local passenger services over the former NSR route were withdrawn in 1947 and all other services were withdrawn from Colwich in 1958, when the station was closed.

The former station house remains alongside the tracks and is now a Grade II listed building.

See also
Colwich rail crash, which took place at the site of the station in 1986.

References
Notes

Sources

Further reading

Disused railway stations in Staffordshire
Former London and North Western Railway stations
Former North Staffordshire Railway stations
Railway stations in Great Britain closed in 1958
Railway stations in Great Britain opened in 1847
1847 establishments in England
John William Livock buildings